West Branch Papakating Creek is a tributary of Papakating Creek located in Frankford and Wantage townships in Sussex County, New Jersey, in the United States.

See also
 Clove Brook
 Neepaulakating Creek
 Wallkill River
 List of rivers in New Jersey

Rivers of Sussex County, New Jersey
Papakating Creek watershed
Rivers of New Jersey
Tributaries of the Wallkill River